WABC may refer to:

New York broadcasters 
 WABC (AM), a radio station (770 AM)
 WABC-TV, the flagship station of the ABC television network (channel 7)

Former callsigns 
 WPLJ, a radio station (95.5 FM), which formerly used the call sign WABC-FM
 WCBS (AM), a radio station (880 AM), which formerly used the WABC call sign

Other broadcasters 
 Classic Gold WABC, a defunct British radio station